Sông Cầu may refer to several places in Vietnam, including:

Sông Cầu, a district-level town of Phú Yên Province
Sông Cầu, Bắc Kạn, a ward of Bắc Kạn City
Sông Cầu, Thái Nguyên, a township of Đồng Hỷ District
, a rural commune of Khánh Vĩnh District.

See also
Cầu River, a river in northern Vietnam